is a Japanese judoka. She won the gold medal in the half lightweight event, and silver medal in mixed team, at the 2020 Olympics held in Tokyo, Japan.

Personal life
Uta Abe is the sister of current 66 kg standout judoka, and three-times world champion, Hifumi Abe.

Judo career
Abe became the youngest ever Judoka to win an IJF (International Judo Federation) Grand Prix, when she captured first place at the Düsseldorf Grand Prix in February 2017.

She participated at the 2018 World Judo Championships in Baku, Azerbaijan and won her first world title at 18 years of age, making her the third-youngest Judoka to ever capture a senior World title.  Abe firstly defeated Polish judoka, Karolina Pienkowska and Fabienne Kocher of Switzerland. She then defeated Jessica Pereira of Brazil and in the semi-finals she defeated Amandine Buchard of France in under 40 seconds, by armlock to make her way into the finals. In the finals, Abe was matched with teammate and former-world champion Ai Shishime, and defeated Shishime with a spectacular uchi-mata in golden score for ippon.

In 2021, Abe won the gold medal at the Tokyo 2020 Olympics on the same day that her older brother Hifumi won the gold medal in his judo division.

Family 
She is the younger sister of fellow Olympic Gold medallist in Judo, Hifumi Abe, her older brother. Three-times Olympic champion Tadahiro Nomura is her uncle.

References

External links

 
 
 
 

2000 births
Living people
Japanese female judoka
World judo champions
Sportspeople from Kobe
Judoka at the 2020 Summer Olympics
Olympic gold medalists for Japan
Olympic silver medalists for Japan
Medalists at the 2020 Summer Olympics
Olympic judoka of Japan
Olympic medalists in judo
21st-century Japanese women